Indian apple is a common name for several plants and may refer to: 

Podophyllum peltatum, a toxic, herbaceous perennial plant
Datura innoxia, a hallucinogenic plant
Pomegranate, a fruit-bearing plant native to Asia
Limonia acidissima, a fruit-bearing tree native to South Asia.
Phyllanthus emblica, a small fruit-bearing tree native to India.